D-Trick is the second solo album by Daisuke Asakura, as well as the last solo album released by him before he joined the popular J-pop group Access. It was released on September 2, 1992 and features vocals by Reimy on track 5 and Hiroyuki Takami on tracks 5, 7 and 12.

Track listing
 "A Moonlit Night" – 4:26
 "Mignight Party" – 4:11
 "Smile Energy" – 3:53
 "The Door" – 2:14
 "1000 nen no chikai" – 5:37(1000年の誓い)
 "Rainbow in the Universe" – 3:34
 "COSMIC RUNAWAY" – 5:18
 "Kagami no naka no meiro" – 5:52(鏡の中の迷路)
 "Funny Spot" – 4:50
 "Bridge of Harmony" – 3:10
 "Eternal Dream" - 3:47
 "Toybox in the Morning" - 6:08

References
 Official Daisuke Asakura Discography

Daisuke Asakura albums
1992 albums